August G. Meyers (January 1, 1864 – October 26, 1951) was an American farmer, salesman, and politician.

Born in the town of Herman, Sheboygan County, Wisconsin, Meyers went to Janesville College. He was a farmer, a traveling salesman, and hotel owner. He owned the "Washington House" in Howards Grove, Wisconsin and was the postmaster. Meyers served in the Wisconsin State Assembly in 1905 and was a Republican. Meyers was a Wisconsin deputy game warden and was elected county clerk for Sheboygan County. From 1911 to 1927, Meyers was the Wisconsin assistant superintendent for public property. Meyers died in a hospital in Madison, Wisconsin.

Notes

1864 births
1951 deaths
People from Howards Grove, Wisconsin
Businesspeople from Wisconsin
Farmers from Wisconsin
Wisconsin postmasters
Republican Party members of the Wisconsin State Assembly
People from Herman, Sheboygan County, Wisconsin